Kelly Lewis  (born May 18, 1964) is a former Republican member of the Pennsylvania House of Representatives.

Biography
He is a graduate of East Stroudsburg High School. He earned a degree in business administration and finance from Bloomsburg University and a J.D./M.B.A. from the Widener University School of Law.

He served as Monroe County Controller from 1996 through 2000, where he oversaw annual operating budgets exceeding $100 million and cost-saving measures and financial system improvements for the county.

He was elected to represent the 189th legislative district in the Pennsylvania House of Representatives in 2000, when he defeated long-term incumbent Joseph Battisto in "one of the biggest upsets in PA House history." He focused his efforts on reforming the property tax system, successfully lobbying both 2002 gubernatorial candidates to commit to addressing the issue. Lewis' bill, Act 9 of 2001, created the Education Investment Tax Credit program in Pennsylvania and helped expand access to automated external defibrillators, placing 2,400 in Pennsylvania schools and public buildings. Still among the largest AED bids ever, Pennsylvania's bids for AEDs helped lower AED prices by 50%.  He resigned his seat in the legislature on December 6, 2004, to take a position as President of the Technology Council of Central Pennsylvania.

From 2005 to May 2012, Kelly Lewis was the President & CEO of TechQuest Pennsylvania, now known as the Technology Council of Pennsylvania, the trade group for the technology industry in Pennsylvania. For many years, Mr. Lewis was the host of TechQuest TV, a statewide television program featuring interviews with leaders of Pennsylvania's technology industry. In 2007, Lewis helped co-found the Pennsylvania Infrastructure Group, which led dozens of successful infrastructure initiatives.

Presently, Kelly Lewis is the President of Lewis Strategic, a firm providing products and services to Pennsylvania companies, governments, hospitals, universities and non-profits. Lewis is also the President and CEO of Allied Health Information Exchange Company, a health IT solutions firm.

References

External links
Pennsylvania House of Representatives - Kelly Lewis (Republican) official PA House profile (archived)
Pennsylvania House Republican Caucus - Representative Kelly Lewis official Party website (archived)
Interview with Kelly Lewis
 www.lewisstrategic.com

Bloomsburg University of Pennsylvania alumni
Living people
Republican Party members of the Pennsylvania House of Representatives
Widener University alumni
1964 births
People from East Stroudsburg, Pennsylvania